Jean Scott may refer to:
 Jean Scott, Lady Ferniehirst (c. 1548 - after 1593) Scottish borders landowner
 Jean Scott (author), author of gambling books
 Jean Scott (figure skater), 1972 Olympian
 Jean Scott (football) (born 1994), Costa Rican association football player
 Jean Bruce Scott (born 1956), American television actress

See also
Gene Scott (disambiguation)